The 2008 Independent Spirit Awards can refer to:
23rd Independent Spirit Awards, a ceremony held in 2008, honoring the films of 2009
24th Independent Spirit Awards, a ceremony held in 2009, honoring the films of 2008

Independent Spirit Awards